Lossow may refer to:

People
Otto von Lossow, a Bavarian general who was involved in the Beer Hall Putsch
Heinrich Lossow, a German artist and pornographer
William Lossow, the architect of the Leipzig Hauptbahnhof and the Staatsschauspiel Dresden
Jim von Lossow, a golfer and the 1986 winner of the Pacific Northwest PGA Championship
Rodney Lossow, an American football player

Fictional
Captain Lossow, a character in Sharpe's Gold

Places
Lossow Castle, a gord at Frankfurt Oder